Nessun Dorma is a 2016 Hong Kong psychological thriller film directed by Herman Yau and starring Gordon Lam, Andy Hui and Janice Man. The film is based on the novel of the same title by Erica Li and Zendodric, both of whom also served as the film's screenwriters. Nessun Dorma had its world premiere at the 40th Hong Kong International Film Festival on 22 March 2016 and was theatrically released in Hong Kong on 27 October.

Cast
Gordon Lam as Vincent Lee (李偉臣)
Andy Hui as Fong Mo-chit (Ngai Man-yin) (方慕哲)
Janice Man as Jasmine Tsang (曾斯敏)
Wilfred Lau as Fong Mo-chit
Jacky Cai as Mimi
Tarah Chan as Amy (Club Girl)
Phat Chan as Vincent's Driver
Julius Brian Siswojo (credited as Brian Lee) as Apartment Security
Candice Yu as Jasmine's mother

Production
Filming for Nessun Dorma began on 2 August 2015. Due to the complexity of her role in the film, Janice Man reportedly suffered from insomnia for a few weeks during production of the film.

Release
The film had its world premiere at the 40th Hong Kong International Film Festival on 22 March 2016, where it showed the original Category III-rated version of the film. A new Category IIB-rated version of the film was theatrical released in Hong Kong on 27 October.

Reception

Box office
The film  grossed  in mainland China.

Critical reception
Elizabeth Kerr of The Hollywood Reporter calls the film a "pulpy, unchallenged slice of genre entertainment", stating how "viewers will enjoy for what it is and forget quickly", while also praising Gordon Lam's performance.

References

External links

2016 films
2016 psychological thriller films
Hong Kong psychological thriller films
Rape and revenge films
2010s Cantonese-language films
Films directed by Herman Yau
Films based on Chinese novels
Films based on thriller novels
Films set in Hong Kong
Films shot in Hong Kong
2010s Hong Kong films